Boon Point is the northernmost point on the island of Antigua.

References 

Headlands of Antigua and Barbuda
Saint John Parish, Antigua and Barbuda